Todd Gibson (December 23, 1936 – December 1, 2020) was an American racing driver from Morral, Ohio, and Richwood, Ohio.

A champion short-track racer in Supermodified racing, Gibson made his USAC Championship Car debut  in 1969 at the Milwaukee Mile. He competed in one other race that year and failed to qualify for two more.  He was away from Championship Cars until 1976 when he returned to compete in 8 races, mostly on the large speedways and finished 23rd in the national championship.  In 1977 Gibson attempted to qualify for 10 races and qualified for 7, the Indianapolis 500 being one of the races where he failed to make the field.  Gibson registered his best Champ Car finish that year with a 4th-place finish at Mosport, his only road course start, backed up by 6th-place finishes at Texas and Trenton.  He finished a career-best 18th in the 1977 USAC Championship.  In 1978 he made four starts on intermediate ovals with little success in his own Eagle-Offy.  Gibson sided with USAC in the USAC-CART split of 1979 and competed in the first two races of the season at Ontario and Texas, but crashed in practice for the Indy 500, after which he retired from Champ Car competition. He returned to Supermodified for select races, concluding his career at the 1988 Oswego 200.

Gibson's son Gene Lee was also a successful Supermodified racer, and his son Larry competed in the Automobile Racing Club of America's Midget Series, while his grandson Zachary raced in the ARCA Re/Max Series in 2009.

References

External links
Photos of Todd Gibson in 1977 at Indy

1936 births
2020 deaths
People from Marion County, Ohio
Racing drivers from Ohio
World of Outlaws drivers